UFAG (German: Ungarische Flugzeugfabrik A.G., Hungarian: Magyar Repülőgépgyár Rt. in short: "MARE"), was a Hungarian aircraft manufacturer formed by the Ganz Works and the Manfred Weiss Works in Budapest in 1912. They built aircraft of their own design as well as under licence from Lohner and Hansa-Brandenburg.

History
It was not until 1912 that the first Hungarian aircraft factory was born in Budapest, at the corner of Hungária körút and Váci út, with the cooperation of Ganz-Danubius, the Weiss Manfréd factory, the Hitelbank and the financial wizard Camilio Castiglioni, who had also helped BMW to prosper. The company was given the creative name of First Hungarian Airship and Aircraft Factory and, lacking its own types, started to produce biplane Lohner aircraft.

The company's first manager was the twenty-four-year-old Viktor Wittmann, who in 1910, with a degree in mechanical engineering in his pocket, set off for Reims, France, to study in what was then the citadel of European aircraft manufacturing. The following year, he was already testing aircraft for the Monarchy's air force at Aspern airbase in Austria.
In May 1915, during a demonstration flight of one of the factory's military aircraft, he lost control of the plane and crashed from an altitude of 30 to 40 metres.

However, the first and earliest site of the factory did not have an airport, so most of the aircraft parts had to be transported to Rákosmező, where the airplanes were assembled and tested.

In the light of this, and the increasing demand for aircraft, it is not surprising that the company grew rapidly, outgrowing its available space. They found a new site in Albertfalva, the Mecca of the carpenters of the time, on the outer section of Fehérvári út, where there was enough space not only for halls but also for an airport (which was actually just a flat field, as the runways were not paved at the time).

Hansa-Brandenburgische Flugzeug Werke then joined the company's ownership, and from then on the company began to produce aircraft under the names MARE (Magyar Repülőgépgyár Rt.) and UFAG (Ungarische Flugzeugfabrik Aktien Gesellschaft), including an increasing number of German-designed Hansa-Brandenburg C.I. aircraft, which accounted for a quarter of the Austro-Hungarian Empire's First World War fleet, 1,258 of them.

These were, of course, still canvas-covered, wood-frame and plywood machines - which was why the carpenters who were to be found in the area were so well served - and were powered by 160, 200 and 230 hp Hiero engines manufactured by UFAG. They were armed with one or two Schwarzlose machine guns, redesigned for aircraft, with greatly increased rate of fire.

UFAG aircraft 
(Ungarische Flugzeugfabrik Abteil Gesellschaft / Ungarische Flugzeugwerke Aktien Gesellschaft)
Data from:Austro-Hungarian Army Aircraft of World War One
 UFAG 60.01
 UFAG 60.02 (D.I)
 UFAG 60.03 (C.II)
 UFAG series 160 - Hansa-Brandenburg C.II(U)
 UFAG series 61 - Hansa-Brandenburg C.I(U)  - Austro-Daimler 210hp (160 kW) engine
 UFAG series 161 - UFAG C.I
 UFAG series 62 - Hansa-Brandenburg G.I(U) 
 UFAG series 63 - Hansa-Brandenburg C.I(U) - 120 kW (160 hp) Mercedes D.IIIs
 UFAG series 64 - Hansa-Brandenburg C.I(U) - Austro-Daimler 210 hp (160 kW) engine
 UFAG series 66 - Hansa-Brandenburg C.II(U)
 UFAG series 67 - Hansa-Brandenburg C.I(U)  - Austro-Daimler 210 hp (160 kW) engine
 UFAG series 68 - Hansa-Brandenburg C.I(U) - Austro-Daimler 210 hp (160 kW) engine
 UFAG series 69 - Hansa-Brandenburg C.I(U) - 150 kW (200 hp) Hiero V-8?
 UFAG series 169 - Hansa-Brandenburg C.I(U) - with 160 kW (220 hp) Benz Bz.IVas
 UFAG series 269 - Hansa-Brandenburg C.I(U) - Austro-Daimler 210 hp (150 kW) engine
 UFAG series 369 - Hansa-Brandenburg C.I(U) - 170 kW (230 hp) Hiero 6
 UFAG C.I
 UFAG C.II
 UFAG D.I

References

Defunct aircraft manufacturers of Hungary
Defunct manufacturing companies of Austria-Hungary
Manufacturing companies based in Budapest